Juan Gilberto Goyoneche Carrasco (born 14 October 1985) is a Peruvian football player. He is a goalkeeper who currently plays for Universidad Técnica de Cajamarca.

Club career
Goyoneche made his debut for Alianza Lima in 2005 season because of an injury at that time to Leao Butrón.

Goyoneche played for Juventud Barranco in the 2010 Copa Perú.

In 2011, he played for Piura based club Atlético Grau in the 2011 Copa Perú season. He also made 3 appearances for Atlético Grau in the 2011 Torneo Intermedio. Goyoneche played in the round of 16 tie against C.D. Universidad Cesar Vallejo. The match was decided in a penalty shootout, which his side lost 4–3.

In January 2012, Goyoneche joined newly promoted club Real Garcilaso for the start of the 2012 season.

References

External links
 
 

1985 births
Living people
People from Lima Region
Association football goalkeepers
Peruvian footballers
Club Alianza Lima footballers
Deportivo Municipal footballers
Real Garcilaso footballers
Juan Aurich footballers
Peruvian Primera División players
Copa Perú players